Adrian Brown is a reporter for Al Jazeera. 

He recently returned to Sydney after almost 16 years running a reporting and camera company based in Hong Kong. During that time, he also filed stories for National Nine News. Some of the biggest stories he has reported on include the 1989 Student uprising in China, 1991 Gulf War, September 11 attacks and East Timor.

His most recent assignments include the war in the Middle East, the Football World Cup in Germany and the 2004 Boxing Day Tsunami and its recovery operation. He currently reports for both Seven News and SBS's Dateline'' on local, national and international stories.

References
Biography on Seven News website

Australian television presenters
Australian television journalists
Living people
Year of birth missing (living people)